The 2021–22 Montenegrin First League was the 16th season of the first tier association football in the country of Montenegro. The season began on 24 July 2021 and ended on 24 May 2022. The winners of the league qualified for a place in the 2022–23 UEFA Champions League.

Budućnost were the defending champions having won the league in the previous season.

Teams

OFK Titograd (relegated after eleven years in the top flight) were relegated after finishing tenth in the previous season. Mornar (promoted after a two-year absence) will replace them in the league after earning promotion from the Montenegrin Second League as league champions in the previous season.

League table

Results
Clubs were scheduled to play each other four times for a total of 36 matches each.

First half of season

Second half of season

Relegation play-offs
The 10th-placed team (against the 3rd-placed team of the Second League) and the 11th-placed team (against the runners-up of the Second League) will both compete in two-legged relegation play-offs after the end of the season.

Summary

Matches

Rudar won 5–3 on aggregate.

Arsenal won 5–1 on aggregate.

Statistics

Top goalscorers

See also 
 Montenegrin First League

References

External links 
 UEFA
 FSCG

Montenegrin First League seasons
Monte
1